Wormy, drawn and written by David A. Trampier (1954 – March 24, 2014), was a fantasy comic strip about a talking dragon named Wormy. The strip was originally serialized in the role-playing magazine Dragon.

The September 1977 issue of Dragon (Issue #9) featured the first 6-panel comic of Wormy. The first comic featured the title character, a cigar-chomping, pool hustling, wargaming dragon, and subsequent issues revealed the cast of goblins and ogres who were his neighbors and friends. Wormy continued to appear in Dragon for the next 10 years, until Issue #132 (April 1988).

Disappearance
In the late 1980s, Wormy creator David A. Trampier abruptly vanished from public life.  The final installment of Wormy ended the strip in the middle of an unfinished storyline. No further Wormy comics were ever published.

References

External links
A Collection of David A. Trampier's Wormy

American comic strips
American comics characters
Fantasy comics
Fantasy parodies
Parody comics
1977 comics debuts
1988 comics endings
Dungeons & Dragons
Comics characters introduced in 1977
Fictional dragons